Gegham Khandilyan (14 October 1974 – 22 June 2009) was a popular Armenian television actor. He died as a result of a car accident on the Ejmiatsin-Armavir highway in Armenia. He was 34. He was not married. Also dead on the same incident was another Armenian actor Aram Miskaryan.

Gegham Khandilyan was best known for his role as  "Gokor" on the television series "Vorogayt" (Trap), a series based on gangster life.

References

1974 births
2009 deaths
Armenian male television actors
Road incident deaths in Armenia
20th-century Armenian male actors